Skinman is the second and final studio album by Australian Thrash metal band Allegiance, released in 1996. The album was produced in Perth, Western Australia by John Villani.

Track listing
"Ripped To Shreds" - 3:42
"Face Reality" - 2:53
"Give Yourself" - 4:23
"Scorn" – 3:00
"Time To React" – 4:27
"Trapped Behind A Shadow" - 4:03
"Wasted Life" - 4:48
"Taken By Force" - 3:23
"Pity" - 3:08
"Hands Of Fate" - 6:12

Personnel 
 Conrad Higson – lead vocals
 Jason Stone - Guitar, Keyboards
 Tony Campo - Guitar
 David Harrison - Bass
 Glenn Butcher - Drums
 John Villani - Producer

References

1996 albums
Allegiance (Australian band) albums
Mercury Records albums